Sports injuries are injuries that occur during sport, athletic activities, or exercising. In the United States, there are approximately 30 million teenagers and children who participate in some form of organized sport. Of those, about three million athletes age 14 years and under experience a sports injury annually. According to a study performed at Stanford University, 21 percent of the injuries observed in elite college athletes caused the athlete to miss at least one day of sport, and approximately 77 percent of these injuries involved the knee, lower leg, ankle, or foot. In addition to those sport injuries, the leading cause of death related to sports injuries is traumatic head or neck occurrences.

When an athlete complains of pain, injury, or distress, the key to diagnosis is a detailed history and examination. An example of a format used to guide an examination and treatment plan is a S.O.A.P note or, subjective, objective, assessment, plan. Another important aspect of sport injury is prevention, which helps to reduce potential sport injuries. It is important to establish sport-specific dynamic warm-ups, stretching, and exercises that can help prevent injuries common to each individual sport.

An injury prevention program also consists of education on hydration, nutrition, monitoring team members "at risk", monitoring at-risk behaviors, and improving technique. In addition, season analysis reviews, preseason screenings, and pre-participation examinations are essential in recognizing pre-existing conditions or previous injuries that could cause further illness or injury. One technique that can be used in the process of preseason screening is the functional movement screen. The functional movement screen can assess movement patterns in athletes in order to find players who are at risk of certain injuries. In addition, prevention for adolescent athletes should be considered and may need to be applied differently than adult athletes. Lastly, following various research about sport injury, it is shown that levels of anxiety, stress, and depression are elevated when an athlete experiences an injury depending on the type and severity of the injury.

Types of sport injury 
Nearly two million people every year suffer sports-related injuries and receive treatment in emergency departments. Fatigue is a large contributing factor that results in many sport injuries. There are times where an athlete may participate on low energy leading to the deterioration in technique or form, resulting in a slower reaction time, loss in stability of muscle joints, and allowing an injury to occur. For both sexes the most common areas injured are the knee and ankle, with sprains/strains being the most common areas for injury. Injuries involving the patellofemoral articulation are significantly more frequent among females. The sport with the highest injury rate in the United States is American football, with greater than 12 times the number of injuries seen in the next most common sport.

Soft tissue injuries 

When soft tissue experiences trauma the dead and damaged cells release chemicals, which initiate an inflammatory response. The small blood vessels that are damaged become dilated which produce bleeding within the tissue. The body's normal response includes forming a small blood clot in order to stop the bleeding and allows a clot of special cells, called fibroblasts, to form. This begins the healing process by laying down scar tissue. Therefore, the inflammatory stage is the first phase of healing. However, too much of an inflammatory response in the early stage can indicate that the healing process takes longer and a return to activity is delayed. Sports injury treatments are intended to minimize the inflammatory phase of an injury, so that the overall healing process is accelerated. Intrinsic and extrinsic factors are determinant for the healing process.

Soft tissue injuries can be generally grouped into three categories: contusions, abrasions and lacerations. Contusions or bruises are the simplest and most common soft tissue injury and is usually a result of blunt force trauma. Severe contusions may involve deeper structures and can include nerve or vascular injury. Abrasions are superficial injuries to the skin no deeper than the epidermis tissue layer, and bleeding, if present, is minimal. Minor abrasions generally do not scar, but deeper abrasions generally bleed and may scar. Lastly, sports-related lacerations are caused by blunt trauma and result in burst-type open wounds, often with jagged irregular edges. Facial lacerations are the most variable of the soft tissue injuries that athletes can sustain. They can occur intraorally and extraorally, vary from a superficial skin nick to a through and through lip laceration, or involve significant vascular disruption or injury to collateral vital structures.

Hard tissue injuries 
Types of hard tissue injuries can include dental and bone injuries and are less frequent than soft tissue injuries in sport, but are often more serious. Hard tissue injuries to teeth and bones can occur with contusions, such as Battle sign, which indicates basilar skull fracture, and so-called raccoon eyes, which indicate mid-face fractures. However, tooth fractures are the most common type of tooth injury, and can be categorized as crown infractions, enamel-only fracture, enamel-dentin fractures, and fractures that extend through the enamel and dentin into the pulp which are defined below.

 Crown infractions are characterized by a disruption of the enamel prisms from a traumatic force, these injuries typically present as small cracks that affect only the enamel.
 Enamel-only fractures are mild and often appear as roughness along the edge of the tooth crown. These injuries typically can go unnoticed by the athlete as they are usually not sensitive to the touch or to temperature changes. Enamel-only fractures are not considered dental emergencies and immediate care is not needed.
 Enamel-Dentin crown fractures typically present as a tooth fracture confined to enamel and dentin with loss of tooth structure, but not exposing the pulp. The athlete often will report sensitivity to air, cold or touch, but the athlete can return to play as tolerated and referral can be delayed up to 24 hours.
 Enamel-Dentin-Pulp fractures extend through the enamel and dentin and into the pulp. If the pulp is vital, a focal spot of hemorrhage will be noticeable within the yellow dentin layer and the athlete may report acute pain. Referral to a trauma-ready dentist should occur as soon as possible.

In addition to tooth fractures, there are several types of bone fractures as well. These types being closed or simple, open or compound, greenstick, hairline, complicated, comminuted, avulsion, and compression. A complicated fracture is when the structures surrounding the fracture are injured, such as blood vessels, organs, nerves, etc.

Overuse injuries 
Overuse injuries can be defined as injuries that result from a mechanism of repetitive and cumulative micro-trauma, without a specific onset incident. Rapid changes in physical growth can make children vulnerable to overuse injuries, and these types of injuries are increasing among youth populations. Overuse injuries can usually be classified into 4 types/stages, these include:

 Pain in the affected area during activity (which does not affect performance)
 Pain in the affected area during activity (which does restrict performance)
 Pain in the affected area after activity
 Chronic pain in the affected area, even after resting

Predictive Indicators of Overuse Injuries in Adolescent Endurance Athletes, runners seem to account for the majority of injuries (up to 80 percent) with the majority of these injuries (more than two-thirds), occurring in the lower extremity and being of an overuse nature. Although incidence rates in senior athletics has been reported as 3.9 injuries/1000 hours of practice, specific injury incidence in youth track and field varies among disciplines; whereas an overall incidence of 0.89 injuries/1000 hours has been reported for high school track and field athletes. In addition, long-distance runners have showed a 19 times higher incidence (17 injuries/1000 hours) than other disciplines.

Head and neck injuries 
Head and neck injuries can include a variety of pathologies from sprains, strains and fractures to traumatic brain injuries and spinal cord injuries. Sprains and strains can occur from an abrupt rotation or whipping motion, such as whiplash. Stress injuries (stress fractures and stress reactions) of the lumbosacral region are one of the causes of sports-related lower back pain in young individuals. The onset of the observed cervical fractures in sports injury were likely due to continued momentum that transferred loads superiorly through the neck, which likely exacerbated the injuries to the occipital condyles and the upper cervical vertebrae. Researchers have reported that 3-25% of cervical spine injuries actually occur after the initial traumatic event and are caused or exacerbated by improper handling during early stages of management or patient transport. One of the more common head or neck injuries that occurs in sports is a concussion. A concussion is a type of mild traumatic brain injury resulting in a chemical change in the brain and has potential to cause damage to brain tissue. This can occur when a person sustains a hit or blow that cause the head and brain to move quickly, causing the brain to bounce in the skull. According to an epidemiological study published in the Journal of Athletic Training, the incidence of concussions from 27 high school sports was 3.89 sports-related concussions per 10,000 athlete exposures.

Sports related musculoskeletal injuries 
Subacromial impingement syndrome is a shoulder joint injury. Baseball players are prone to get affected with subacromial impingement syndrome, as the sport requires an overhead movement of the arms to make a throw. Injury causes mechanical inflammation in the subacromial space – the space above the shoulder's ball and socket joint and the top most shoulder bone. Muscular strength imbalances, poor scapula, and rotator cuff tears are the main causes of subacromial impingement syndrome. Overhead movement of the arms instigates pain.

Falling on an outstretched arm and pulling on the shoulder, repetitive lifting of heavy loads or overhead movement cause rotator cuff tears.

Anterior Cruciate Ligament Injury: common in skiing, soccer, football, and basketball. Immediately after injury the subject will fall to the ground, acute swelling sets in, knee is destabilized, and bearing weight becomes a difficulty. Knee injury in contact sports, and jumping, deceleration, and pivoting in non-contact sports and activities cause anterior cruciate ligament injury.

Collateral Ligament Injury: an injury to a partially flexed knee can damage the medial collateral ligament – the ligament stretching along the inner edge of the knee. A forceful medial blow to the knee can cause collateral ligament injury. A reduction in range-of-motion and pain are symptoms of collateral ligament injury.

Meniscus injuries: acute or repeated injury to the meniscus – the shock absorber of the knee – causes meniscus injuries. A person with meniscus injuries experience difficulty squatting and walking instigates pain.

Runner's knee (Patellofemoral pain): knee joint pain affecting the patellofemoral joint. Pain is a direct consequence of the kneecap rubbing against the end of the thigh bone – "patella" means kneecap and "femur" means a thigh bone. The force the patellafemoral joint has to sustain can be as much as five times the body weight when the knee is fully flexed – when squatting – and three times body weight when the knee flexes to 90 degrees – when climbing stairs. This makes the cartilage that makes up the patellafemoral joint susceptible to wear and tear. The typical pain is also associated with muscle strength and joint flexibility. Repetitive physical activity such as running can trigger pain. Tight hamstrings, tight Achilles tendons, and weak thigh muscles, which are required to stabilize the knee, cause runner's knee.

Inversion Ankle Sprain: landing on an uneven surface sprains the ankle. swelling, localized pain, difficulty bearing weight, and limping are signs of inversion ankle sprain.

Eversion Ankle Sprain: injury related to the ankle turning outward or rotating externally. A typical symptom of eversion ankle sprain is excruciating pain that worsens with weight bearing.

Risk factors 

There are several factors that may put an athlete more at risk for certain injuries than others. Intrinsic or personal factors that could put an athlete at higher risk for injury could be gender. For example, female athletes are typically more prone to injuries such as ACL tears. There are approximately 1.6-fold greater rate of ACL tears per athletic exposure in high school female athletes than males of the same age range. Other intrinsic factors are age, weight, body composition, height, lack of flexibility or range of motion, coordination, balance, and endurance. In addition, biological factors such as pes planus, pes cavus, and valgus or varus knees that can cause an athlete to have improper biomechanics and become predisposed to injury. There are also psychological factors that are included in intrinsic risk factors. Some psychological factors that could make certain individuals more subject to injury include personal stressors in their home, school, or social life. There are also extrinsic risk factors that can effect an athlete's risk of injury. Some examples of extrinsic factors would be sport specific protective equipment such as helmet, shoulder pads, mouth guards, shin guards, and whether or not these pieces of equipment are fitted correctly to the individual athlete to ensure that they are each preventing injury as well as possible. Other extrinsic factors are the conditions of the sport setting such as rain, snow, and maintenance of the floor/field of playing surface.

Prevention 

Prevention helps reduce potential sport injuries. Benefits include a healthier athlete, longer duration of participation in the sport, potential for better performance, and reduced medical costs. Explaining the benefits of sports injury prevention programs to coaches, team trainers, sports teams, and individual athletes will give them a glimpse at the likelihood for success by having the athletes feeling they are healthy, strong, comfortable, and capable to compete.

Primary, secondary, and tertiary prevention 
Prevention can be broken up into three broad categories of primary, secondary, and tertiary prevention. Primary prevention involves the avoidance of injury. An example is ankle braces being worn as a team. Even those with no history of previous ankle injuries participate in wearing braces. If primary prevention activities were effective, there would be a lesser chance of injuries occurring in the first place. Secondary prevention involves an early diagnosis and treatment once an injury has occurred. The goal of early diagnosis is to ensure that the injury is receiving proper care and recovering correctly, thereby limiting the concern for other medical problems to stem from the initial traumatic event. Lastly, tertiary prevention is solely focused on rehabilitation to reduce and correct an existing disability resulting from the traumatic event. Thus, for an athlete with an ankle injury, rehabilitation would consist of balance exercises to recover strength and mobility, as well as wearing an ankle brace while gradually returning to the sport.

Season analysis 
It is most essential to establish participation in warm-ups, stretching, and exercises that focus on main muscle groups commonly used in the sport of interest. This decreases the chances for getting muscle cramps, torn muscles, and stress fractures. A season analysis is an attempt to identify risks before they occur by reviewing training methods, the competition schedule, traveling, and past injuries. If injuries have occurred in the past, the season analysis reviews the injury and looks for patterns that may be related to a specific training event or competition program. For example, a stress fracture injury on a soccer team or cross country team may be correlated to a simultaneous increase in running and a change in running environment, like a transition from a soft to hard running surface. A season analysis can be documented as team-based results or individual athlete results. Other key program events that have been correlated to injury incidences are changes in training volume, changes in climate locations, selection for playing time in important matches, and poor sleep due to tight chaotic scheduling. It is important for team program directors and staff to implicate testing in order to ensure healthy, competitive, and confident athletes for their upcoming season.

Preseason screening 
Another beneficial review for preventing player sport injuries is preseason screenings. A study found that the highest injury rate during practices across fifteen Division I, II, and III NCAA sports was in the preseason compared to in-season or postseason. To prepare an athlete for the wide range of activities needed to partake in their sport pre-participation examinations are regularly completed on hundreds of thousands of athletes each year. It is extremely important that the physical exam is done properly in order to limit the risks of injury and also to diagnose early onsets of a possible injury. Preseason screenings consist of testing the mobility of joints (ankles, wrists, hips, etc.), testing the stability of joints (knees, neck, etc.), testing the strength and power of muscles, and also testing breathing patterns. The objective of a preseason screening is to clear the athlete for participation and verify that there is no sign of injury or illness, which would represent a potential medical risk to the athlete (and risk of liability to the sports organization). Besides the physical examination and the fluidity of the movements of joints the preseason screenings often takes into account a nutrition aspect as well. It is important to maintain normal iron levels, blood pressure levels, fluid balance, adequate total energy intake, and normal glycogen levels. Nutrition can aid in injury prevention and rehabilitation, if one obtains the body's daily intake needs. Obtaining sufficient amount of calories, carbohydrates, fluids, protein, and vitamins and minerals is important for the overall health of the athlete and limits the risk of possible injuries. Iron deficiency, for example, is found in both male and female athletes; however 60 percent of female college athletes are affected by iron deficiency. There are many factors that can contribute to the loss in iron, like menstruation, gastrointestinal bleeding, inadequate iron intake from the diet, general fatigue, weakness, among others. The consequences of iron deficiency, if not solved, can be an impaired athletic performance and a decline in immune and cognitive function.

Functional movement screen 
One technique used in the process of preseason screening is the functional movement screen (FMS). Functional movement screening is an assessment used to evaluate movement patterns and asymmetries, which can provide insight into mechanical restrictions and potential risk for injury. Functional movement screening contains seven fundamental movement patterns that require a balance of both mobility and stability. These fundamental movement patterns provide an observable performance of basic locomotor, manipulative, and stabilizing movements. The tests place the individual athlete in extreme positions where weaknesses and imbalances become clear if proper stability and mobility is not functioning correctly. The seven fundamental movement patterns are a deep squat, hurdle step, in-line lunge, shoulder mobility, active straight-leg raise, trunk stability push-up, and rotary stability. For example, the deep squat is a test that challenges total body mechanics. It is used to gauge bilateral, symmetrical, and functional mobility of the hips, knees, and ankles. The dowel held overhead gauges bilateral and symmetrical mobility of the shoulders and the thoracic spine. The ability to perform the deep squat technique requires appropriate pelvic rhythm, closed-kinetic chain dorsiflexion of the ankles, flexion of the knees and hips, extension of the thoracic spine, as well as flexion and abduction of the shoulders. There is a scoring system applied to each movement as follows a score of 3 is given to the athlete if they can perform the movement without any compensations, a score of 2 is given to the athlete if they can perform the movement, but operate on poor mechanics and compensatory patterns to achieve the movement, a score of 1 is given to the athlete if they cannot perform the movement pattern even with compensations, and finally, a 0 is given to the athlete if one has pain during any part of the movement or test. Three of the seven fundamental tests including shoulder mobility, trunk stability push-up, and rotary stability have a clearance scoring associated with them meaning a pass or fail score. If the athlete fails this part of the test a score of 0 is given as the overall score. Once the scoring is complete the athlete and medical professional can review the documentation together and organize a set prevention program to help target and strengthen the areas of weakness in order to limit the risks of possible injuries.

Sport injury prevention for children 
There are approximately 8,000 children treated in emergency rooms each day for sports-related injures. It is estimated that around 1.35 million children will suffer a sports-related injury per year, worldwide. This is why children and adolescents need special attention and care when participating in sports.

According to the Centers for Disease Control and Prevention (CDC), many sports-related injuries are predictable and preventable. Some prevention techniques are listed below.

 Exercise-based injury prevention has shown to reduce injury rates in sports. Sport-specific warm-up programs exist which have proven efficacious in reducing injuries of children.
 Warming up prior to sport improves the blood flow in muscles and allows for the muscle temperature to rise which helps to prevent muscle strains or tears.
 Provide children with the right well fitting equipment for sport like helmets, shin guards, ankle braces, gloves and others to prevent injuries.
 Have breaks and drink water as well to keep them hydrated.

Sports injury prevalence 
Sports that have a higher incidence of contact and collision have the highest rates of injury. Collisions with the ground, objects, and other players are common, and unexpected dynamic forces on limbs and joints can cause sports injuries. Soccer is the sport leading to most competitive injuries in NCAA female college athletes. Gymnastics, on the other hand, has the highest injury rate overall. Swimming and diving is the NCAA sport that has the lowest injury rates. Injury rates were much higher for NCAA women's sports during competitions rather than practices except for volleyball, indoor track, and swimming and diving. For eight of the NCAA sports, many injuries acquired during competition require at least seven days recovery before returning to the sport. In general, more females are injured during practice than in competition. NCAA athlete injury rates are higher in men's ice hockey, basketball, and lacrosse. NCAA athlete injury rates were significantly higher in women's cross country than men's cross country. The NCAA injury rates are roughly the same for soccer, swimming and diving, tennis, and both indoor and outdoor track and field, regardless of gender.

Costs 
Interventions targeted at decreasing the incidence of sports injuries can impact health-care costs, as well as family and societal resources. Sports injuries have direct and indirect costs. The direct costs are usually calculated by taking into account the cost of using healthcare resources to prevent, detect, and treat injury. There is a need for research about how healthcare is used and the expenses that coincide with it. Included in these expenses are how different injuries may have different prognoses. Indirect costs may be taken into account as well, when an injury prevents an individual from returning to work it may hinder the economic benefit to themselves and others.

For collegiate athletics, the estimated cost of sport injuries ranges from $446 million to $1.5 billion per year. For high school athletics, the yearly estimated cost of sport injuries ranges from $5.4 billion to $19.2 billion. Medical costs in the United States for sports injury related emergency department visits exceeded $935 million every year.

Sports-related emotional stress 
Sport involvement can initiate both physical and mental demands on athletes. Athletes must learn ways to cope with stressors and frustrations that can arise from competition against others. Conducted research shows that levels of anxiety, stress, and depression are elevated following sports injuries.  After an occurrence of an injury many athletes display self-esteem issues, athletic identity crises, and high levels of post-traumatic distress, which are linked to avoidant coping skills.

Each year in the United States, 3.5 million athletes are injured; therefore, it is important to understand how injury can impact anxiety. Athletes are exposed to a culture that focuses heavily on success, and injuries can hinder the athlete from reaching their full potential. Because of this reliance on achievement, many players are unlikely to stop performing because of pain they face. An injury could not only impact an athlete's ability to train and compete, but also influence their psyche and mental health. The external pressure by coaches, teammates, fans, and the media on athletes to endure pain and injury instead of refusing to play when hurt have prompted athletes to believe that accepting physical risks is their only choice. This will in turn lead to both physical and mental struggles for the athlete to endure simultaneously and could lead to a worse outcome if not treated appropriately.

In addition, the influences of personal and situational factors can directly impact an athlete's perceptions about their injury. Personal factors include the characteristics of the injury, the athlete's own approach to their injury, and their identity. Situational factors include the nature of the athlete's sport, social influences, and the rehabilitation environment. For example, stressful events such as divorce or employment instability can increase the likelihood of experiencing an injury. An athlete's response to an injury is influenced by a variety of stressors they encountered before the injury and the coping skills they used to overcome previous struggles. Therefore, it is important to utilize an integrated model in the rehabilitation process to account for the cognitive, emotional, and behavioral needs of the athletes.

In the rehabilitation process, athletes may experience anxiety as a result of the injury as well as their underlying personal and situational issues. As mental trainer Jeff Troesch mentions, "recovering from injury can be one of the toughest psychological challenges any athlete faces." All of the uncertainty surrounding the injury and lacking full control over one's body can lead to more anxiety and stress on the athlete. Studies have shown that higher anxiety scores are commonly associated with other comorbidities including depression. In addition, athletes with higher ratings for career dissatisfaction also exhibited higher anxiety scores compared to those who were career satisfied with their career. From these studies it can be inferred that injured athletes experience an increase in anxiety levels as a result of psychosocial factors. Hence, taking these influences into account may assist sports medicine practitioners when planning for the psychological management needs of injured elite athletes.

It is often thought that the physical and psychosocial aspects of injury recovery occur at the same time; however, in reality these two factors do not always coincide when an athlete returns to their sport. Therefore, athletes may prematurely begin training and competing if they feel physically capable, but often they do not account for their psychological state. Although return to sport is usually regarded as a positive rehabilitation outcome, many studies have highlighted greater levels of anxiety and fear experienced by injured athletes as they transition back to their sport. Athletes have reported that reinjury and underperforming when they return to play are common causes of this increase in anxiety and fear. Because some athletes may not be mentally prepared when they return to their sport, chances of underperformance and reinjury are higher. Furthermore, injured athletes with greater levels of trait anxiety can frequently face increased recovery time. In order to ensure that athletes are both physically and psychologically prepared to return to sport, rehabilitation facilities should utilize methods to assist athletes in both capacities.

When addressing psychological readiness during the recovery process, rehabilitation facilities should encourage confidence-building and provide social support to the athletes. Developing confidence in returning to sport includes "having trust in the rehabilitation provider, satisfaction of social support needs, and achievement of physical standards/clinical outcomes." Social support can operate as a buffer for the amount of anxiety and stress associated with an injury by positively affecting the athlete's psychological and emotional wellbeing. In turn, this support can improve the athlete's motivation and coping skills during the rehabilitation process. In addition, research suggests that emotional social support, which prioritizes "empathy, love, trust, and caring" can benefit injured athletes psychologically as they recover. With greater emphasis on the psyche, athletes will be more motivated to envision their injury recovery as a new competition or task, rather than a roadblock that hinders them from achieving their dreams.

To accommodate psychosocial factors in recovery, services must be accessible to the athletes. Although many universities provide psychological services to their students, these employees may not be trained in handling athlete-specific factors, and thus may not be able to address the particular needs of injured athletes. Therefore, certified athletic trainers who work with athletes on a consistent basis can be an important resource for providing emotional social support to injured athletes. In previous studies, athletes who were content with the social support they received by their athletic trainers were 87% less likely to report symptoms of depression and anxiety. Thus, such athletic trainers involved in the athlete's regular activities can be effective in facilitating psychological interventions during the rehabilitation process.

Currently, mental health struggles are often surrounded by stigma and can be seen as a weakness for high-level athletes. When discussing Kara Goucher's openness to sharing her difficulty with negative self-talk and confidence, the author acknowledged that this example is rare in the world of athletics because such struggles are usually considered a weakness. If more athletes like Kara Goucher communicate about their mental health, others will feel more inclined to discuss their own issues instead of keeping it to themselves. Therefore, de-stigmatizing and engaging in conversations about mental health can encourage athletes to enlist help for their internal struggles throughout their sports career and during an injury. Mindfulness-based interventions that integrate the mind and body have begun to address mental health needs among high-level athletes. Not only has mindfulness been shown to positively impact general well-being and improve performance, but it could also be utilized as a "protective factor to stress and stress-related psychological issues." The stigma associated with mental health as a weakness is a common barrier impeding help-seeking behaviors for athletes whose primary goal is to achieve perfection and success in their sport.

Elite athletes dedicate an immense amount of time and effort and can suffer from both physical and mental roadblocks. Therefore, it is important that rehabilitation programs account for mental health as a strong component of the recovery process for athletes, so that they are better prepared to manage not only the physical burden but also the psychological effects of their injury. Understanding the injured athlete experience from a physical, psychological, and social perspective is essential for athletes to return to their sport when they are both physically and mentally prepared and perform at their optimal level.

Many student-athletes do not seek mental health support. Research suggests that only 10% of college athletes with mental health conditions seek support.  This means that out of approximately 500,000 college athletes, only 50,000 seek help. Awareness is another challenge of support. In a survey evaluating mental health support for college athletes, 60% of male athletes and 55% of female athletes were not aware how to find or access mental health support.

See also 
 Baseball injury list
 Doping in sport
 Health issues in athletics
 Health issues in youth sports
 Injured reserve list
 Orchard Sports Injury and Illness Classification System (OSIICS)
 Squatting position
 Physical injuries in Yoga

References

Further reading 
 Armatas, V.1, Chondrou, E., Yiannakos, A., Galazoulas, Ch., Velkopoulos, C. Physical Training 2007. January 2007. 21 March 2009 <http://ejmas.com/pt/2007pt/ptart_galazoulas_0707.html>.
 Cluett, Jonathan M.D. Medial Collateral Ligament Treatment. 29 May 2006. 16 April 2009 <http://orthopedics.about.com/cs/kneeinjuries/a/mclinjury_2.htm>.
 Doermann, David. Continuum, The Magazine of the University of Utah. Spring 1998. 19 March 2009 <http://www.alumni.utah.edu/continuum/spring98/sidelines.html>.
 Lysaght, Michael J. Knee Injuries and Therapies in Competitive Athletes. 20 March 2009 <http://biomed.brown.edu/Courses/BI108/BI108_2004_Groups/Group06/Group6project/Homepage.htm>.
 Selesnick, Harlan. Sports Injuries ESPN. 4 October 2007.

External links 
 Sports injuries at the National Health Service (NHS)